Pat Dowling (born 1936 in Castlemartyr, County Cork) is a former Irish sportsperson. He played hurling with his local club Castlemartyr and was a member of the Cork senior inter-county team in the 1950s. Dowling won a Munster title, as well as an All-Ireland runner-up medal with Cork in 1956.

References

1936 births
Living people
Castlemartyr hurlers
Sarsfields (Cork) hurlers
Cork inter-county hurlers
New York hurlers
Date of birth missing (living people)